The 2023 Virginia Tech Hokies baseball team represents Virginia Tech during the 2023 NCAA Division I baseball season. The Hokies play their home games at English Field as a member of the Atlantic Coast Conference. They are led by head coach John Szefc, in his 6th season at Virginia Tech.

Game log

Rankings

References

External links 
 VT Baseball

Virginia Tech Hokies
Virginia Tech Hokies baseball seasons
Virginia Tech Hokies baseball